Iopromide is an iodinated contrast medium for X-ray imaging. It is marketed under the name Ultravist which is produced by Bayer Healthcare. It is a low osmolar, non-ionic contrast agent for intravascular use; i.e., it is injected into blood vessels.

It is commonly used in radiographic studies such as intravenous urograms, brain computer tomography (CT) and CT pulmonary angiograms (CTPAs).

Medical uses
The radiocontrast agent is given intravenously in computed tomography (CT) scans, angiography and excretory urography.

References

External links 
  Bayer Schering Pharma global Ultravist Website

Radiocontrast agents
Benzamides
Acetanilides
Iodoarenes